Bullard Block may mean:
 Bullard Block (Los Angeles)
 Bullard Block (Schuylerville, New York)